Joe Trainer (born March 6, 1968) is an American football coach, former player, and former athletic director. He was the defensive coordinator for Villanova from 2014 to 2018.  He served as head football coach at Millersville University of Pennsylvania from 2005 to 2007, and the University of Rhode Island from 2009 to 2013, compiling a career college football record of 25 wins and 64 losses.

Trainer is a native of Roslyn, Pennsylvania.

Head coaching record

Post-coaching career 
After his stint with the Rams he joined Pope John Paul II High School in Royersford, Pennsylvania as their athletic director before stepping down in 2022. After being the athletic director for four years he stepped down to become a school counselor at La Salle College High School in Wyndmoor, Pennsylvania.

References

1968 births
Living people
Colgate Raiders football coaches
Dickinson Red Devils football players
Frostburg State Bobcats football coaches
Millersville Marauders football coaches
New Haven Chargers football coaches
Rhode Island Rams football coaches
Temple Owls football coaches
Villanova Wildcats football coaches
Temple University alumni
Villanova University alumni
People from Abington Township, Montgomery County, Pennsylvania
People from North Kingstown, Rhode Island
Coaches of American football from Pennsylvania
Players of American football from Pennsylvania